is a Shinto shrine in Aoba-ku, Sendai, Miyagi, Japan. The  has been designated a National Treasure of Japan.
Beppyo shrines

History
The construction of the present shaden was ordered by the wealthy daimyō Date Masamune. He hired craftsmen from Kyoto and central Japan, some of whom had previously worked for the Toyotomi family. The shrine was erected between 1604 and 1607. The lavish decoration with wood carving, painting, metal fittings, and lacquer emulated recent models from central Japan, in particular, the Toyokuni shrine in Kyoto. Since the early Meiji period the shrine was called Ōsaki Hachiman Jinja. In consideration of historical circumstances, its original name was reinstated in June 1997. On November 22, 1952, the shaden was designated as a National Treasure.

Architecture
It is a single-storied structure consisting of a main sanctuary (honden) and a worship hall (haiden) which are joined via a connecting passage called ishi-no-ma. All three structures are under a single roof which is covered with thin shake shingles (kokerabuki 柿葺) made from Japanese cypress.

The honden is a 5 ken (間, bay) by 3 ken structure with a hip-and-gable, irimoya style roof to which a simple gabled roof of the 3 ken by 1 ken ishi-no-ma connects. The haiden is also 3 ken deep and 7 ken wide. Its roof is like that of the honden of the hip-and-gable type. The entrance is covered by a 5 ken wide step canopy with an undulating karahafu gable at eave ends (nokikarahafu).

See also
List of National Treasures of Japan (shrines)

References

External links

 Ōsaki Hachimangū official site 
 Ōsaki Hachimangū English pamphlet

Shinto shrines in Miyagi Prefecture
Buildings and structures in Sendai
Date clan
National Treasures of Japan
Hachiman shrines